The 2015–16 season was Burton Albion's 66th season in their history and first ever in League One after gaining promotion the previous season. Along with League One, the club also took part in the FA Cup, League Cup and JP Trophy. The season covers the period from 1 July 2015 to 30 June 2016.

Transfers

Transfers in

Transfers out

Loans in

Loans out

Competitions

Pre-season friendlies
On 19 May 2015, Burton Albion announced their full pre-season schedule. On 24 May 2015, Burton Albion confirmed their planned pre-season fixture against Benfica was cancelled due to the Portuguese club being invited to take part of the 2015 International Champions Cup. On 29 June 2015, Burton Albion confirmed details of their matches during the tour of the Netherlands.

League One

League table

Matches
On 17 June 2015, the fixtures for the forthcoming season were announced.

FA Cup

League Cup
On 16 June 2015, the first round draw was made, Burton Albion were drawn away against Bolton Wanderers. In the second round, Burton Albion were handed a home tie against Middlesbrough.

Football League Trophy
On 8 August 2015, live on Soccer AM the draw for the first round of the Football League Trophy was drawn by Toni Duggan and Alex Scott. Burton will travel to Doncaster Rovers.

Birmingham Senior Cup
On the Birmingham FA website details of the first round was released, Burton will face Boldmere St. Michaels.

References

Burton Albion F.C. seasons
Burton Albion